Rhinagrion is a genus of damselflies in the family Philosinidae. There are about 10 described species in Rhinagrion, found mainly in southeast Asia.

Species
These 10 species belong to the genus Rhinagrion:
 Rhinagrion borneense (Selys, 1886)
 Rhinagrion elopurae (McLachlan in Selys, 1886)
 Rhinagrion hainanense Wilson & Reels, 2001
 Rhinagrion macrocephalum (Selys, 1862)
 Rhinagrion mima (Karsch, 1891)
 Rhinagrion philippinum (Selys, 1882)
 Rhinagrion reinhardi Kalkman & Villanueva, 2011
 Rhinagrion schneideri Kalkman & Villanueva, 2011
 Rhinagrion tricolor (Krüger, 1898)
 Rhinagrion viridatum Fraser, 1938

References

Calopterygoidea